Joe "Old Forty-Five" Scotland (August 18, 1882 – May 10, 1923) was an American baseball center fielder in the Negro leagues. He played from 1914 to 1919 with the Indianapolis ABCs, Louisville White Sox, Chicago Union Giants, and the Indianapolis Jewell's ABCs.

References

External links

Birmingham Giants players
Louisville White Sox (1914-1915) players
Indianapolis ABCs players
1882 births
1923 deaths
Baseball players from Montgomery, Alabama
Baseball players from Indianapolis
20th-century African-American people
Baseball outfielders